Mark Kendall Bingham (May 22, 1970 – September 11, 2001) was an American public relations executive who founded his own company, the Bingham Group. During the September 11 attacks in 2001, he was a passenger on board United Airlines Flight 93. Bingham was among the passengers who, along with Todd Beamer, Tom Burnett and Jeremy Glick, formed the plan to retake the plane from the hijackers, and led the effort that resulted in the crash of the plane into a field near Shanksville, Pennsylvania, thwarting the hijackers' plan to crash the plane into a building in Washington, D.C., most likely either the U.S. Capitol Building or the White House.

His heroic efforts on United Flight 93, as well as his athletic physique, were noted for having prompted a reassessment of gay stereotypes.

Early life
Mark Bingham was born in 1970, the only child of Alice Hoagland and Gerald Bingham. When Mark was two years old, his parents divorced. Raised by his mother and her family, Mark grew up in Miami, Florida, and Southern California before moving to the San Jose area in 1983. Bingham was an aspiring filmmaker, and as a teenager he began using a video camera as a personal diary to document his life and those of his family and friends. He graduated from Los Gatos High School as a two-year captain of his rugby team in 1988. As an undergraduate at the University of California, Berkeley, Bingham played on two of Coach Jack Clark's national-championship-winning rugby teams in the early 1990s. He also joined the Chi Psi fraternity, eventually becoming its president. Upon graduation at the age of 21, Bingham came out as gay to his family and friends.

Rugby and business career
Bingham played No. 8 in their first two friendly matches. He played in their first tournament, and taught his teammates his favorite rugby songs.

At the time of his death, Bingham had recently opened a satellite office of his public relations firm in New York City and was spending more time on the East Coast. He discussed plans with his friend Scott Glaessgen to form a New York City rugby team, the Gotham Knights.

September 11, 2001
On the morning of September 11, Bingham overslept and nearly missed his flight, on his way to San Francisco to be an usher in his fraternity brother Joseph Salama's wedding. He arrived at Terminal A at Newark International Airport at 7:40 am, ran to Gate 17, and was the last passenger to board United Airlines Flight 93, taking seat 4D, next to passenger Tom Burnett.

United Airlines Flight 93 was scheduled to depart at 8:00 am, but the plane did not depart until 42 minutes later due to runway traffic delays. Four minutes later, American Airlines Flight 11 crashed into the World Trade Center's North Tower. At 9:03 am, as United Airlines Flight 175 crashed into the South Tower, Flight 93 climbed to cruising altitude, heading west over New Jersey and into Pennsylvania. At 9:25 am, Flight 93 was above eastern Ohio, and pilots Jason Dahl and LeRoy Homer received an alert, "Beware of cockpit intrusion," on the cockpit computer device ACARS (Aircraft Communications and Reporting System). Three minutes later, Cleveland controllers could hear screams over the cockpit's open microphone. Moments later, the hijackers, led by the Lebanese Ziad Jarrah, took over the plane's controls and told passengers, "Keep remaining sitting. We have a bomb on board". Bingham and the other passengers were herded into the back of the plane. Within six minutes, the plane changed course and headed for Washington, D.C. Several of the passengers made phone calls to loved ones, who informed them about the two planes that had crashed into the World Trade Center.

After the hijackers veered the plane sharply south, the passengers decided to act. Bingham, along with Todd Beamer, Tom Burnett and Jeremy Glick, formed a plan to take the plane back from the hijackers. They relayed this plan to their loved ones and the authorities via telephone. Bingham got through to his aunt's home in California. Bingham stated, "This is Mark Bingham. I want to let you guys know that I love you, in case I don't see you again...I'm on United Airlines, Flight 93. It's being hijacked." According to The Week, Hoagland formed the impression that her son spoke "confidentially" with a fellow passenger, to form a plan to retake the plane. According to ABC News, the call cut off after about three minutes. Hoagland, after seeing news reports of the plane's hijacking, called him back and left two messages for him, calmly saying, "Mark, this is your mom. The news is that it's been hijacked by terrorists. They are planning to probably use the plane as a target to hit some site on the ground. I would say go ahead and do everything you can to overpower them, because they are hellbent. Try to call me back if you can." As they made their decision to retake the plane, Glick related this over the phone to his wife, Lyz. Fellow passenger Todd Beamer, speaking to GTE-Verizon Lisa Jefferson and the FBI, related that he too was part of this group. They were joined by other passengers, including Lou Nacke, Rich Guadagno, Alan Beaven, Honor Elizabeth Wainio, Linda Gronlund, and William Cashman, along with flight attendants Sandra Bradshaw and Cee Cee Ross-Lyles, in discussing their options and voting on a course of action, ultimately deciding to storm the cockpit and take over the plane.

According to the 9/11 Commission Report, after the plane's voice data recorder was recovered, it revealed pounding and crashing sounds against the cockpit door and shouts and screams in English. "Let's get them!" a passenger cries. A hijacker shouts, "Allah akbar!" ("God is great"). Jarrah repeatedly pitched the plane to knock passengers off their feet, but the passengers apparently managed to invade the cockpit, where one was heard shouting, "In the cockpit. If we don't, we'll die." At 10:02 am, a hijacker ordered, "Pull it down! Pull it down!" The plane was 20 minutes of flying time away from its suspected target, the White House or the U.S. Capitol Building in Washington, D.C. According to Vice President Dick Cheney, President George W. Bush gave the order to shoot the plane down.

Legacy

Bingham is survived by his parents and the Hoagland family members who played a part in his upbringing, by his stepmother and various stepsiblings, and by his partner of six years, Paul Holm. Holm described Bingham as a brave, competitive man, saying, "He hated to lose—at anything." He was known to proudly display a scar he received after being gored at the Running of the Bulls in Pamplona, Spain. He is buried at Madronia Cemetery, Saratoga, California.

U.S. Senators John McCain and Barbara Boxer honored Bingham on September 17, 2001, in a ceremony for San Francisco Bay Area victims of the attacks, presenting a folded American flag to Paul Holm.

The Mark Kendall Bingham Memorial Tournament (referred to as the Bingham Cup), a biennial international rugby union competition predominantly for gay and bisexual men, was established in 2002 in his memory.

Bingham, along with the other passengers on Flight 93, was posthumously awarded the Arthur Ashe Courage Award in 2002.

The Eureka Valley Recreation Center's Gymnasium in San Francisco was renamed the Mark Bingham Gymnasium in August 2002.

Singer Melissa Etheridge dedicated the song "Tuesday Morning" in 2004 to his memory.

Beginning in 2005, the Mark Bingham Award for Excellence in Achievement has been awarded by the California Alumni Association of the University of California, Berkeley, to a young alumnus or alumna at its annual Charter Gala.

At the National 9/11 Memorial, Bingham and other passengers from Flight 93 are memorialized at the South Pool, on Panel S-67.

At the Flight 93 National Memorial in Pennsylvania, Bingham's name is located on one of the 40  panels of polished,  granite that comprise the Memorial's Wall of Names.

The 2013 feature-length documentary The Rugby Player focuses on Bingham and the bond he had with his mother, Alice Hoagland, a former United Airlines flight attendant who, following his death, became an authority on airline safety and a champion of LGBT rights. Described by ESPN as "an insightful and stereotype-shattering exploration" of Bingham's life, the film, which is directed by Scott Gracheff, relies on the vast amount of video footage Bingham himself shot beginning in his teens until weeks before his death. The film's alternate title, With You, is a popular rugby term, and one of Bingham's favorite expressions.  The film premiered on Australia's ABC2 on August 20, 2014.

References

Further reading
 Barrett, Jon Hero of Flight 93: Mark Bingham, Advocate Books, 2002 
 "UNITED FLIGHT 93: On Doomed Flight, Passengers Vowed to Perish Fighting" The New York Times. September 13, 2001

External links

 Mark Bingham: a Tribute to a Wonderful Man, a Great Friend, a Loving Brother, and an American Hero.
 sffog.org: Mark's rugby team, the S.F. Fog (Mark's Memorial page).
 Advocate Magazine article on Bingham.
 Daily Cal Article referencing Mark attacking Stanford tree.
 Mark Bingham Scholarship Fund.
 Official Website of The Bingham Cup.
 Team Bingham - Mark Bingham Scholarship fundraising Organization.
 
 After September 11: Farewell to a Hero (California Monthly tribute).
 With You: The Mark Bingham Story
 

1970 births
2001 deaths
20th-century American LGBT people
American rugby union players
American terrorism victims
Gay sportsmen
LGBT people from California
American LGBT sportspeople
LGBT rugby union players
Male murder victims
People from Los Gatos, California
Sportspeople from Phoenix, Arizona
People murdered in Pennsylvania
Terrorism deaths in Pennsylvania
United Airlines Flight 93 victims
University of California, Berkeley alumni
American sportsmen
Burials in California
West Valley College alumni
American business executives